Hartmann Luggage is a manufacturer of luggage and leather goods established in 1877  in Milwaukee, Wisconsin by trunkmaker Joseph S. Hartmann, a Bavarian.

In 1956, the company opened a manufacturing operation in Tennessee, and the company's headquarters and plant facilities followed in 1959. Hartmann was bought by Brown Forman Corporation before being acquired by private equity firm Clarion Capital Partners in 2007.

Hartmann luggage has been recognized as being of fine quality. The company is known for producing distinctive collections of luggage such as Wings and Tweed, which are associated with traditional American style. Many of its products were manufactured in the United States and are now outsourced globally, but mostly China and other parts of Asia. The Tweed Collection was updated & re-named Tweed Legend in 2018.

The Associated Press published on September 1, 2007: "Hartmann Luggage spokesman Ronald Roberts said the manufacturing operation will be moved outside the U.S.
We'll be working with the Caribbean, Central America and China".Hartmann Luggage was sold to Samsonite in May 2012 and the Factory and Head Office in Lebanon closed in December 2012.

References

External links
 Hartmann company website
LinkedIn

Companies based in Tennessee
History of Milwaukee
Samsonite
American companies established in 1877
Luggage brands